The men's high jump event  at the 1974 European Athletics Indoor Championships was held on 9 March in Gothenburg.

Results

References

High jump at the European Athletics Indoor Championships
High